Ludwig Karl Wilhelm Freiherr von Gablenz (19 July 1814 – 28 January 1874) was an Austrian general of Saxon origin.

Early life
Born in Jena in 1814 to a Saxon noble family, he entered the Saxon Army at the age of 17. In 1833 he transferred to the Austrian service. Gablenz fought in the First Italian War of Independence. Promoted to Major in the General-Staff-Corps he was transferred to Hungary to combat the Hungarian Revolution and was posted to the staff of FM Alfred I, Prince of Windisch-Grätz and then as the chief of staff to GdK Schlik's army corps. For his services in Hungary Gablenz was promoted to colonel in December 1849.

General officer
Gablenz was made Generalmajor in May 1854 and was given command of a brigade in the occupation corps of the Danube principalities. In 1857 he was given an infantry brigade in FML Zobel's VII Corps. Ennobled as an Austrian baron in March 1858, Gablenz served in the Second Italian War of Independence, where he fought at Magenta and Solferino. Transferred to the V Corps, Gablenz was promoted to Feldmarschall-Leutnant in 1862.

In December 1863 Gablenz was appointed to command of the VI Corps, with which he served in the Second Schleswig War, where he particularly distinguished himself at Oeversee and Düppel. For his success in Schleswig-Holstein Gablenz was awarded the Commanders Cross of the Order of the Military Order of Maria Theresa.  Appointed a Privy Councilor in November 1864 he became the commanding general of the V Corps and was named governor of Duchy of Holstein, which he remained until the outbreak of the Austro-Prussian War.

At the start of this war, which mostly took place in Eastern Bohemia (Czech Republic), Gablenz was considered to be one of the foremost Austrian generals. During this war Gablenz commanded the X Corps in FZM Benedek’s Northern Army. Although victorious against Bonin's I Corps at Trautenau (Trutnov, 27 June 1866) in the only Austrian victory against the Prussians, Glabenz's position became untenable due to the Austrian loss at Náchod and the Prussian Guard Corps' advance towards Eipel (Upice), and he was ordered to retreat towards Prausnitz to block the Prussian Guards. The next day at Burkersdorf, Gablenz managed to extricate his corps though with heavy casualties. After reuniting with the main army Gablenz and X Corps fought at Königgrätz (Hradec Králové).

After the war he became commanding general in Croatia and Slavonia (June 1867). In April 1868 he was promoted to General der Kavallerie and made the commanding general in Hungary in July 1869.
 
Following the stock market crash of 1873 Gablenz was plagued by debt and fearing the loss of Emperor Franz Joseph's confidence he committed suicide in Zürich on 28 January 1874. He was first buried at the Zurich municipal cemetery, but in 1905 his remains were transferred into the newly completed crypt of the warrior monument built in 1868 to commemorate the Battle of Trautenau. Gablenz's former tombstone of the Zurich municipal cemetery was also taken to Trautenau and it is situated opposite the monument.

Notes

References
 Bassett, Richard, For God and Kaiser: The Imperial Austrian Army, 1619-1918, Yale University Press, 2015. 
 Wawro, Geoffrey, The Austro-Prussian War: Austria’s War with Prussia and Italy in 1866, Cambridge University Press, Cambridge, UK, 1997
 Ludwig von Gablenz

1814 births
1874 deaths
19th-century Austrian people
Austro-Hungarian generals
Austrian military personnel of the Italian Independence Wars
People of the Austro-Prussian War
Commanders Cross of the Military Order of Maria Theresa
Recipients of the Pour le Mérite (military class)
Suicides in Switzerland
Austrian military personnel of the Second Schleswig War